Marys Creek is a  long 3rd order tributary to the Haw River, in Alamance County, North Carolina.

Course
Marys Creek rises on the west side of Bass Mountain, about 5 miles southeast of Rock Creek in Alamance County, North Carolina and then flows east to the Haw River about 3 miles southeast of Saxapahaw, North Carolina.

Watershed
Marys Creek drains  of area, receives about 46.6 in/year of precipitation, and has a wetness index of 425.73 and is about 44% forested.

See also
List of rivers of North Carolina

References

Additional Maps

Rivers of North Carolina
Rivers of Alamance County, North Carolina